In mathematics, a Fekete polynomial is a polynomial

where  is the Legendre symbol modulo some integer p > 1.

These polynomials were known in nineteenth-century studies of Dirichlet L-functions, and indeed to Dirichlet himself. They have acquired the name of Michael Fekete, who observed that the absence of real zeroes t of the Fekete polynomial with 0 < t < 1 implies an absence of the same kind for the L-function

This is of considerable potential interest in number theory, in connection with the hypothetical Siegel zero near s = 1. While numerical results for small cases had indicated that there were few such real zeroes, further analysis reveals that this may indeed be a 'small number' effect.

References
 Peter Borwein: Computational excursions in analysis and number theory. Springer, 2002, Chap.5.

External links

 Brian Conrey, Andrew Granville, Bjorn Poonen and Kannan Soundararajan, Zeros of Fekete polynomials, arXiv e-print math.NT/9906214, June 16, 1999.

Polynomials
Zeta and L-functions